Martin Joseph Ward (born 13 July 1991) is a British professional boxer. He held the British super-featherweight title from 2016 to 2017, and the Commonwealth and European super-featherweight titles from 2017 to 2018.

Life
Martin Ward is the son of a builder, and one of five children. Some of his brothers, including John Ward, who in 2010 was the Junior European champion in his weight class. He attended Sawyers Hall College, but left school at age 14. He trains at the Repton Boxing Club in Bethnal Green. In August 2012, he and his brother John Ward were shot on farmland in Essex in what Essex police called a "neighbour feud." Francis O'Donoghue was sentenced to sixteen and half years for the shooting.

Amateur career
Martin Ward won the title in 2007 at the Junior European Union Championships (Cadets) of the European Union in Porto Torres in the weight class under 46 kg, just edging out Hamza Touba from Germany in points (23-22). At the Junior European Championship (Cadets) of the same year in Siofok, he earned the bronze medal. He also won a bronze at the Junior World Championship (Cadets) 2007 in Baku, where he lost in the semi-final against Elvin Isayev from Azerbaijan by points (5-18).

In 2008, he earned a silver in flyweight at the Brandenburg Cup in Frankfurt an der Oder, losing to Qualid Berlaoura from France to points (9-18). In 2009, he won another international title, the European Youth Championship (formerly Junior Championship) in Szczecin in featherweight, defeating in the final round Bunjamin Aydin from Turkey by points (4-0).

In 2010, Martin Ward became the first English featherweight champion with a points victory in the final over Ryan Farrag (18-4). Later that year he won the 1st Championship of Great Britain, where he defeated lightweight Josh Taylor from Scotland in the finals (10-9). He qualified in England for participation in the 2011 European Amateur Boxing Championships in Ankara in lightweight. He started there in lightweight, defeating Tomas Vano from Slovakia (20-6) and Ildar Vaganov from Russia (16-10) to points. His victory over Vaganov, in particular, caused a stir, but in the quarterfinals, he was defeated by Vladimir Saruhanyan from Armenia to points (15-22) and thus finished fifth.

Based on these successes, he was hopeful of being able to participate in the 2012 Summer Olympics in London. However, in the 2011 World Championships in Baku he was defeated in the second round by Robson Conceição of Brazil (20-21), after being docked two points by the referee. For this reason, he was not selected to participate in the Olympic Games in London.

International championships

English championships

International matches

Professional career
He began his professional career on 8 September 2012, where he has had considerable success.

Ward vs. Boschiero 
Ward fought Devis Boschiero on 30th November, 2018. Boschiero went into the fight ranked at #11 by the IBF at super featherweight. The scorecards were announced as in favor of Ward, who won by split decision.

Ward vs. Amparan 
On 8 February, 2020, Ward beat Jesus Amparan by points in the 10th round.

Ward. vs Fuzile 
On 29th May 2021, Azinga Fuzile beat Ward by technical knockout in the 8th round. Fuzile was ranked number 5 by the IBF at super featherweight.

Professional boxing record

References

External links

Martin Joseph Ward - Profile, News Archive & Current Rankings at Box.Live

1991 births
English male boxers
Lightweight boxers
Living people
Sportspeople from Leeds